Linus Eklöf (born 3 March 1989) is a Swedish motorcycle speedway rider who won the Team U-19 European Champion title in 2008.

In 2009 he rode in the Premier League in the UK, averaging over six points per match for treble-winning King's Lynn Stars, staying with them in 2010 (averaging over 7 that season) and also riding in the Elite League for Peterborough Panthers. He left British speedway in June 2010 for personal reasons, returning in 2011 with Berwick Bandits in the Premier League and Belle Vue Aces in the Elite League.

He reached the Swedish individual final in 2010. In July 2012 he was signed by Premier League Leicester Lions.

In 2022, he came out of retirement to help with the rider shortage (due to injuries) at Lejonen.

Career details

World Championships 
 Individual U-21 World Championship
 2007 - 18th place in Qualifying round 2 as track reserve
 2008 - 11th place in Semi-Final 1
 Team U-21 World Championship (Under-21 World Cup)
 2009 -  Gorzów Wlkp. - 3rd place (5 pts)

European Championships 
 Individual U-19 European Championship
 2008 -  Stralsund - 8th place (8 pts)
 Team U-19 European Championship
 2008 -  Rawicz - European Champion (11 pts)

See also 
 Sweden national speedway team

References 

Swedish speedway riders
Team Speedway Junior European Champions
1989 births
Living people
Leicester Lions riders
People from Eskilstuna
Sportspeople from Södermanland County